Gösta Nordgren, known as Snoddas (30 December 1926 - 18 February 1981) was a Swedish entertainer (singer, actor) and bandy player. Born in Arbrå, Gävleborg County, Snoddas was by profession a timber rafter, which he also sings about in his most famous song Flottarkärlek (1952) which became the best selling song up till that time in Sweden with over 300.000 records sold. Snoddas played bandy for Bollnäs GIF. As an actor Snoddas starred in two Åsa-Nisse films in 1952 and 1967.

References

Further reading
Several books about Snoddas and his work have been published in Swedish. These include
 Adenby, Torsten. 1952. Boken om Snoddas. Stockholm: Forum förlag.
 Dahlström, Eva (ed). 1994. Doris, Snoddas och alla vi andra - berättelser från 50-talet. Örebro: Folkrörelsernas arkiv. 
 Sima, Jonas. 2006. Sagan Snoddas - Sverige i oskuldens tid. Stockholm: Carlsson förlag. 

1926 births
1981 deaths
People from Bollnäs Municipality
Swedish male film actors
20th-century Swedish male actors
20th-century Swedish male singers
Swedish bandy players
Bollnäs GIF players